Henry King Braley (March 17, 1850 – January 18, 1929) was an American politician who served as Mayor of Fall River, Massachusetts.

Braley was appointed as an associate justice of the Massachusetts Supreme Judicial Court in the place of Marcus Perrin Knowlton. Knowlton had been elevated to the position of Chief Justice of the Massachusetts Supreme Judicial Court after Oliver Wendell Holmes, Jr. was appointed as an associate justice of the Supreme Court of the United States.

Personal life 
Braley was born in Rochester, Massachusetts to Samuel Tripp Braley and Mary A. (King) Braley on March 17, 1850. He got his early education at Pierce Academy and Rochester Academy. He was married to Caroline W. Leach on April 29, 1875 in Bridgewater, Massachusetts.

References 

1850 births
1929 deaths
Mayors of Fall River, Massachusetts